Ellesmere Port railway station is located in the town of Ellesmere Port, Cheshire, England. The station was an intermediate though station on the Hooton–Helsby line. Now all passenger services terminate at the station from both directions. It is both a terminus of the Wirral Line, a commuter rail system operated by Merseyrail and of Northern Trains services to Warrington Bank Quay. Departures and arrivals of Merseyrail services are on platform 1 with departures and arrivals to Warrington Bank Quay on platform 2.

History 
The station is situated on the branch of the Birkenhead Railway from Hooton to Helsby which opened in 1863.  The station itself opened on 1 July 1863, as Whitby Locks. It was renamed Ellesmere Port on 1 September 1870.  The station building is recorded in the National Heritage List for England as a designated Grade II listed building.

Ellesmere Port became part of the Merseyrail network in 1994, when the line from Hooton was electrified by British Rail and through train services to Liverpool's city centre via Birkenhead commenced.

Liverpool City Region Combined Authority, Long Term Rail Strategy document of October 2017, page 37, states that a trial of new Merseyrail battery trains will be undertaken in 2020, in view to extend the Wirral Line branch terminal to Helsby. If successful, Helsby will be one of the terminals of the Wirral line superseding Ellesmere Port.

Facilities
The station is staffed from Monday to Friday, between 06:05 and 14:00, and is unstaffed otherwise. The station has platform CCTV, a 109-space car park and a cycle rack with 10 spaces and secure storage for 14 cycles. Each platform has a waiting shelter. There are live electronic departure and arrival screens, on the platform, for passenger information. There is a payphone, next to the entrance, on platform 1. The station has vending machines, within the station concourse, next to the booking office. Platform 1, for Merseyrail services, can be accessed by ramp, for passengers with wheelchairs or prams. Platform 2, for Northern services, can be accessed by a passage alongside the staircase on Whitby Road. Cross-platform access, within the station, is by staircase only.

Outside of the ticket office opening hours passengers must purchase tickets from the Ticket Vending Machine located on the platform. This machine can issue tickets to any destination on the rail network. Passengers failing to purchase a ticket will be liable for a Penalty fare if they board a Merseyrail service without obtaining a valid ticket.

In 2014 the station office buildings were improved on Platform 1, to include a new and improved ticket office, a new toilet, a new café and retention of most of the building's classic features and works.

Services 
Merseyrail Wirral Line services operate every 30 minutes each day (including Sunday) towards Birkenhead and Liverpool. Monday to Friday (except during the leaf-fall season in autumn), a few extra services run towards Liverpool in the morning and from Liverpool in the evening, giving a 15 minutes frequency in the peak direction only. These services are all provided by Merseyrail's fleet of Class 507 and Class 508 EMUs.

As of May 2019, Northern Trains operates a limited service (three trains per day each way, Mondays to Saturdays only) to Helsby via Stanlow & Thornton and Ince & Elton, two of which continue on weekdays to Warrington Bank Quay and Manchester Victoria and one return working to Leeds via Todmorden. On Saturdays, all three trains terminate at Helsby.

Platform 1 serves the westbound Merseyrail electric services.
Platform 2 serves the infrequent eastbound Northern Trains diesel train services to Warrington Bank Quay via Helsby.

Gallery

See also

 Listed buildings in Ellesmere Port

References

Notes

Sources

Further reading

External links 

 Uk mapping via yahoo

Railway stations in Cheshire
DfT Category E stations
Grade II listed buildings in Cheshire
Former Birkenhead Railway stations
Railway stations in Great Britain opened in 1863
Railway stations served by Merseyrail
Northern franchise railway stations
Grade II listed railway stations
Ellesmere Port